Riverdale is a passenger rail station on the MARC Camden Line between Union Station in Washington, DC and Baltimore's Camden Station. The station is part of the Riverdale Park Historic District, which has been part of the National Register of Historic Places since 2002.

Station layout
The station has two side platforms and small parking lots on either side of the tracks. The station is not compliant with the Americans with Disabilities Act of 1990.

References

External links
 Trackside view (TrainWeb)
 Station from Queensbury Road from Google Maps Street View

Camden Line
MARC Train stations
Former Baltimore and Ohio Railroad stations
Railway stations in Prince George's County, Maryland
Historic district contributing properties in Maryland
Riverdale Park, Maryland